The article is a list of things named after the Dutchman P. J. W. Debye.

Debye – a unit of electric dipole moment
Debye–Falkenhagen effect
Debye–Hückel equation
Debye–Hückel limiting law, see Debye–Hückel equation 
Debye–Hückel theory, see Debye–Hückel equation
Debye scattering equation
Debye–Scherrer method, see Powder diffraction
Debye–Scherrer rings, see Debye–Scherrer method
Debye–Sears method
Debye–Waller factor
Debye force
Debye frequency, see also Debye model 
Debye function, see also Debye model
Debye length
Debye model 
Debye relaxation
Debye sheath
Debye shielding
Debye temperature, see also Debye model
Lorenz–Mie–Debye theory
Rayleigh–Gans–Debye approximation

Astronomical objects
30852 Debye
Debye (crater)

Others
  Debye Institute for Nanomaterial(s) Science, at the University of Utrecht
 Debye Street and Debye Square, in Maastricht.
 Peter Debye Award

See also
Debye (disambiguation)

Debye